Konradów  (German Dürr-Kunzendorf) is a village in the administrative district of Gmina Głuchołazy, within Nysa County, Opole Voivodeship, in south-western Poland, close to the Czech border.

On 29 January 1945, German SS soldiers were conducting a death march in the area and murdered 138 prisoners on a road leading to Zlaté Hory.

The village has a population of 880.

References

Villages in Nysa County